Maxine Claire Baker (née Newman, born 15 December 1970) is an English former middle-distance runner. She represented Great Britain in the 1500 metres at the 1992 Barcelona Olympics.

Career
Born in Leicester, Newman was a member of OWLS AC Leicester and later Coventry Godiva Harriers. She won the English Schools intermediate 1500m title in 1987 (4:33.3) and the English Schools senior 1500m title in 1989 (4:17.1), and went on to finish sixth in the 1500m final at the 1989 European Junior Championships in 4:16.51. 

Newman ran her 1500 metres best of 4:10.07 on 28 June 1992, when finishing fifth at the AAA Championships/Olympic trials, a time that was just inside the Olympic qualifying standard of 4:10.20. With two of the athletes ahead of her (Yvonne Murray and Liz McColgan) concentrating on other events, she was selected to represent Great Britain in the women's 1500 metres at the 1992 Barcelona Olympics.

International competitions

References

External links
 

1970 births
Living people
Athletes (track and field) at the 1992 Summer Olympics
British female middle-distance runners
Olympic athletes of Great Britain
Place of birth missing (living people)